Derris trifoliata is a plant species in the genus Derris, Family - Leguminosae
It is known as "Karanjvel" in Marathi - local language of Maharashtra, India.

It is a large climber found commonly in coastal swamps of Konkan (India). It is 3-5 meters long. 
Its leaves are alternate, pinnate, 12-20 cm; leaflets 5, ovate, 6-10 com, acuminate, rounded at base.
Flowers are 1 cm in size, in axillary racemes 8-15 cm.
Pods are 3-4 cm, flat, pale yellow in color.

The rotenoid 6aα,12aα-12a-hydroxyelliptone can be found in the stems of D. trifoliata.

The larvae of Hasora hurama feed on D. trifoliata.
Gallery:

References

External links

Millettieae
Plants described in 1790